Nguyễn Văn Thinh (1888 – 10 November 1946, Saigon) was the first President of Cochinchina. Thinh was a French citizen and joined the Constitutionalist Party in 1926. He founded the Cochinchinese Democratic Party in 1937.  He became chief of the provisional government on March 26, 1946, and provisional president on June 1. He felt a loss of face when the French negotiated with the Viet Minh, ignoring his government. "I am being compelled to play a farce," he said. He died, an apparent suicide while still in office, on November 10.

Family and education
Dr. Nguyễn Văn Thinh was born in 1888, in an aristocratic family in the South of Vietnam.

He was the first valedictorian of the Indochina School of Medicine in 1907, and one of the first Vietnamese medical students who successfully passed the examination for Interne Doctors at the Hospital of Paris (Interne des Hôpitaux de Paris).

He worked at Pasteur Institute (Paris), where he finished his thesis.

Political life
Dr. Nguyễn Văn Thinh started his political career as a Constitutionalist by holding Phan Chu Trinh's funeral ceremony. Later, he founded the Democratic Party of Indochina in 1937. He was one of the founders of the Vietnamese Language Propagating Association and the chairman of the Association for Hunger.

Honors
  Legion of Honour

External links 
 Saigon’s hidden presidential palace and forgotten president: the Republic of Cochinchina and Nguyễn Văn Thinh

References

 Biography at Rulers.org

Politicians who committed suicide
1946 deaths
Suicides in Vietnam
1888 births